is a railway station on the Kashii Line operated by JR Kyushu in Sue, Fukuoka Prefecture, Japan.

Lines

Station layout 
The station, which is unstaffed, consists of two side platforms serving two tracks. A station building, a small hut in traditional Japanese style, houses a waiting area and automatic ticket vending machines. Access to the opposite side platform is by means of a level crossing with steps onto the platforms at both ends. A bike shed is provided at the station forecourt.

Adjacent stations

History
On 3 June 1905 the track was extended and Shinbaru was opened as the new southern terminus. On 19 September 1942, the company, now renamed the Hakata Bay Railway and Steamship Company, with a few other companies, merged into the Kyushu Electric Tramway. Three days later, the new conglomerate, which had assumed control of the station, became the Nishi-Nippon Railroad (Nishitetsu). On 1 May 1944, Nishitetsu's track from Saitozaki to Umi were nationalized. Japanese Government Railways (JGR) took over control of the station and the track which served it was designated the Kashii Line. With the privatization of Japanese National Railways (JNR), the successor of JGR, on 1 April 1987, JR Kyushu took over control of the station.

On 14 March 2015, the station, along with others on the line, became a remotely managed "Smart Support Station". Under this scheme, although the station became unstaffed, passengers using the automatic ticket vending machines or ticket gates could receive assistance via intercom from staff at a central support centre.

Passenger statistics
In fiscal 2016, the daily average number of passengers using the station (boarding passengers only) was more than 100 but less than 323.

References

External links
Shinbaru (JR Kyushu)

Railway stations in Fukuoka Prefecture
Railway stations in Japan opened in 1905